Tørvikbygd (coord ) is a village in Kvam municipality Hardanger, Vestland, Norway. The village is located on the west side of Hardanger Fjord, around 13 km south of the community center Norheimsund.

The name comes from a farm name: «Tørvikja» or «Tørvikjo». The prefix «Tør-»  comes from «tyri» («pitch pine»), from old Norwegian "turvi", which meant fat Pine wood.

The village is located at Norwegian national road 49, and is associated by ferry connection with Norwegian national road 550, on the east side of the Hardangerfjord to Jondal. Tørvikbygd has primary school and post office (zip code 5620), and is also housing Tørvikbygd Bygdemuseum.

History  
Tørvikbygd was until 1846 in Strandebarm municipality, but was then, like Jondal municipality, spun off. In 1965 Tørvikbygd area was transferred to Kvam municipality.

References

External links 
Tørvikbygd Bygdemuseum on Kulturnett Hordaland
Fergesambandet Tørvikbygd-Jondal on YouTube

Kvam
Villages in Vestland